The Macchi M.C. 72 is an experimental seaplane designed and built by the Italian aircraft company Macchi Aeronautica. The M.C. 72 held the world speed record for all aircraft for five years. In 1933 and 1934 it set world speed records for piston engine-powered seaplanes; the latter still stands.

Design and development

The Macchi M.C. 72 was one of a series of seaplanes developed by Macchi Aeronautica. In the 1920s, Macchi focused on speed and on winning the Schneider Trophy. In 1922 the company hired aircraft designer Mario Castoldi to design high-speed aircraft.

Further aircraft, the M.52, M.52R and the M.67, were designed and built but victory in the Schneider races kept eluding the Italians. Castoldi then designed the M.C. 72, a single-seater aircraft with two floats powered by a modified FIAT AS.6 supercharged V24 engine, generating around 1,900-2,300 kW (2,500-3,100 hp). driving  contra-rotating propellers .

The forward part of the M.C. 72's fuselage is constructed of metal; aft of the cockpit it is of wood, with a wood skin over a structure of bulkheads and longerons  attached to the front section with four bolts. The nose enclosed an oil tank with its outside wall exposed to the airstream. The wing was all metal, with flat tubular water radiators faired into the wings. The twin floats had three radiators on the outer surfaces, the forward radiator for water and the centre and rear radiators for oil cooling. The float struts also had water radiators and another radiator was fitted during hot conditions under the fuselage running from cockpit to tail.

The M.C. 72 was built in 1931 for what turned out to be the final Schneider Trophy race, but due to engine problems was unable to compete.

Instead of halting development, Macchi continued work on the M.C. 72. Benito Mussolini personally took an interest in seeing development of the M.C. 72 continue and directed state funds to the company.

Operational history
For two years, the M.C. 72 suffered from many mechanical defects, as well as the loss of two test pilots who died trying to coax world class speed out of the M.C. 72 (first Monti and then Bellini). 
After 35 flights the engines were overhauled in preparation for a record attempt. It was piloted by Warrant Officer Francesco Agello (the last qualified test pilot). Not satisfied, development continued as the aircraft's designers thought they could surpass  with the M.C. 72. This record remains (as of 2019) the highest speed ever attained by a piston-engined seaplane. After this success the M.C.72 was never flown again.

Speed record
The M.C. 72 held the world speed record for all aircraft for five years. For comparison, the record holder for a land-based aircraft was held (for a time) by the Hughes H-1 Racer with a top speed of only . Then, in 1939, two German racing aircraft surpassed the M.C. 72. The current world speed record for a piston-engined aircraft is  set by a heavily modified Grumman F8F Bearcat named Rare Bear over three km in 1989. However, the M.C. 72 record still stands as the world's fastest propeller-driven seaplane.

Surviving aircraft
One M.C. 72, the aircraft that took the world record, survives. It is on display at the Italian Air Force Museum, near Rome.

Specifications

See also

References
Notes

Bibliography

 Cowin, Hugh W. The Risk Takers, A Unique Pictorial Record 1908-1972: Racing & Record-setting Aircraft (Aviation Pioneer 2). London: Osprey Aviation, 1999. .
James, Derek N. Schneider Trophy Aircraft 1913-1931. London: Putnam, 1981. 
 Kinert, Reed. Racing Planes and Air Races: A Complete History, Vol. 1 1909-1923. Fallbrook, California: Aero Publishers, Inc., 1969.
 Munson, Kenneth. Flying-boats and Seaplanes since 1910 (Blandford Colour Series: The Pocket Encyclopedia of World Aircraft in Colour). London: Blandford Press, 1971. .
 Taylor, Michael J.H. Jane's Encyclopedia of Aviation (Vol. 4). Danbury, Connecticut: Grolier Educational Corporation, 1980. .

External links

 Gregory Alegi on the MC 72
 The seaplane speed record of Francesco Agello
 Newsreel footage of the Macchi M.C.72

M.C.072
Schneider Trophy
Floatplanes
1930s Italian experimental aircraft
Racing aircraft
Low-wing aircraft
Single-engined tractor aircraft
Aircraft with contra-rotating propellers
Aircraft first flown in 1931